Odostomia eremita is a species of sea snail, a marine gastropod mollusk in the family Pyramidellidae, the pyrams and their allies.

Description
The shell grows to a length of 7 mm.

Distribution
This marine species occurs in the following locations:
 Angola
 Cape Verde
 Republic of the Congo

References

External links
 To Encyclopedia of Life

eremita
Gastropods described in 1999
Molluscs of the Atlantic Ocean
Molluscs of Angola
Gastropods of Cape Verde